Erhard-Heinrich Berner (12 September 1894 – 25 July 1960) was a German general during World War II who commanded several divisions. He was a recipient of the Knight's Cross of the Iron Cross of Nazi Germany. Berner surrendered to the Red Army in 1945. Convicted as a war criminal in the Soviet Union, he was held until 1955.

Awards and decorations
 German Cross in Gold on 24 December 1941 as Major in Infanterie-Regiment 508
 Knight's Cross of the Iron Cross on 18 January 1945 as Oberst and commander of Jäger-Regiment 28

References

Citations

Bibliography

1894 births
1960 deaths
German prisoners of war in World War II held by the Soviet Union
Major generals of the German Army (Wehrmacht)
Recipients of the clasp to the Iron Cross, 1st class
Recipients of the Gold German Cross
Recipients of the Knight's Cross of the Iron Cross
Military personnel from Saxony